The Forest is a 2016 American supernatural horror film directed by Jason Zada and written by Ben Ketai, Nick Antosca, and Sarah Cornwell. The film stars Natalie Dormer, Taylor Kinney, Yukiyoshi Ozawa, and Eoin Macken.

The Forest was released in the United States on January 8, 2016, by Gramercy Pictures. The film received negative reviews from critics, but was a box-office success, grossing $37.6 million against a reported budget of $10 million.

Plot
The majority of the story is set in and around Aokigahara, a forest at the northwest base of Mount Fuji in Japan known as a popular destination for those wanting to die by suicide. Sara Price receives a phone call from the Japanese police telling her that they think her troubled twin sister Jess is dead, as she was seen going into Aokigahara. Despite the concerns of her fiancé Rob, Sara journeys to Japan and arrives at the hotel where Jess was staying.

At the hotel, Sara meets a reporter named Aiden. They drink together, and Sara tells him of her parents' death. In reality, her father committed a murder-suicide, but she tells him they were killed by a drunk driver. Her sister saw the bodies, but Sara did not. Aiden invites her to go into the forest with a park guide, Michi, and him,so she can look for Jess. As the three enter Aokigahara, Michi tells Sara that Jess has most likely killed herself. Sara refuses to believe this, explaining how, being a twin, she can "feel" that Jess is still alive. Deep in the woods, the group discovers a yellow tent that Sara recognizes as belonging to Jess. With nightfall approaching, Michi suggests they leave a note for Jess and leave. Sara refuses, and Aiden volunteers to stay with her through the night. That night, Sara hears rustling in the bushes, and believing it may be Jess, rushes into the woods after her. Sara finds a Japanese girl, Hoshiko, who claims to know Jess. The girl warns Sara not to trust Aiden and flees at the sound of his voice. Sara attempts to chase after her, but falls and loses her.

The next day, Aiden and Sara become lost and begin to walk around the forest. As they walk, Sara's suspicions are raised, and she demands Aiden to give her his phone and finds a picture of Jess on it. Aiden denies any involvement with Jess, but Sara runs into the forest alone. While running, she begins to hear voices telling her to turn around. She appears to be unfazed by this until she hears the voice directly behind her. She turns around to see a hanging body and continues to run away. She then falls through a hole into a cave, and later she wakes up and discovers that she is in the cave with Hoshiko, who turns out to be a yūrei. Hoshiko then turns into what appears to be a "demonic figure". Sara then runs back towards the cave's opening, where Aiden finds her and helps her out of the cave. After some convincing, they continue to walk together. Rob arrives at the Aokigahara forest with a search party and Michi, determined to find Sara.

Aiden takes Sara to an old ranger station he claims he discovered while looking for her. Sara hears her sister's voice coming from a locked basement and finds a note that implies that Aiden is holding Jess captive there. Convinced that he is a threat, Sara attacks and kills Aiden with a small kitchen knife. As he dies, Sara realizes that Aiden was telling the truth and that the picture on his phone, the voice at the basement door, and the note had all been hallucinations.

In the basement of the ranger station, Sara sees a vision of the night her parents died. The ghost of her father suddenly appears and lunges toward her, grabbing her wrist. She cuts his fingers away from her wrist and escapes the station. Running into the forest, she sees Jess running toward the lights of the search party. Sara calls her sister, who is unable to hear her. She realizes that her escape from the ranger station was another hallucination. When she cut at her father's fingers, she actually cut deep into her own wrists and is now dying from blood loss in the basement. As she succumbs to her wounds, the hands of a group of yūrei pull Sara beneath the forest floor. Jess, very much alive, is rescued by the search party and explains that the "feeling" of her sister is gone, and it is assumed that Jess knows Sara is dead. As the search party leaves, Michi suddenly sees a dark figure at the edge of the forest and realizes that it is Sara, who has turned into a yūrei.

Cast
 Natalie Dormer as Sara and Jess Price
 Taylor Kinney as Aiden
 Eoin Macken as Rob
 Stephanie Vogt as Valerie
 Yukiyoshi Ozawa as Michi
 Rina Takasaki as Hoshiko
 Noriko Sakura as Mayumi
 Yûho Yamashita as Sakura
 Akiko Iwase as Head Teacher

Production

Goyer came up with the idea after reading a Wikipedia article on Aokigahara. Surprised that a horror film had not been made about it, he came up with a rough outline. After being pitched the idea, Zada instantly became attracted to it. He was most attracted because the "suicide forest" in Aokigahara was a real place, which he became "obsessed with", reading as much information as he could about the location, including watching an online Vice documentary. Prior to shooting, Zada took a trip to Aokigahara, as he felt, "There's no way I felt that I could make a movie about a real place, and not go visit it." Zada had described the location as "...a very frightening place. It was not a place where I wanted to spend the night."

In October 2014, Natalie Dormer was reported as having joined the cast of the film. In April 2015, Taylor Kinney was reported to have joined the cast, as well.

Dormer cited the opportunity to play two characters in one film enticed her to accept the role. "That's like a life tick box as an actor, to be playing against yourself. It's certainly surreal," she said. "(But) it's hard to make choices as Sara when you don't quite know how you're going to play it as Jess yet. You haven't got the other actor to react against. You have to be a bit schizophrenic."

Kinney cited a confluence of reasons for accepting the role - the story and its location, the ability to tweak his character, and the attachment of Dormer. He stated he was looking for something "more cerebral than gory slasher films", in the vein of The Shining.

Filming
Principal photography began on May 17, 2015, in Tokyo, Japan. As filming in the Aokigahara forest is not permitted by the government, the filmmakers chose a forest near the Tara Mountain in Serbia to double as the Japanese forest in which the film is set. Poor weather plagued the production in Serbia, and many scenes were shot in a former warehouse.

Release
In May 2014, Focus Features acquired domestic distribution rights to the film. On May 20, 2015, Focus Features relaunched their Gramercy Pictures label for action, horror, and science-fiction movies, with the film being one of its releases. The film was released in the United States on January 8, 2016.

Home media
The Forest was released on DVD and Blu-ray on April 12, 2016.

Reception

Box office
, The Forest has grossed $26.6 million in North America and $12.2 million in other territories, for a worldwide total of $38.8 million, against a budget of $10 million.

The film was released on January 8, 2016, alongside the wide release of The Revenant. In its opening weekend, the film was projected to gross $8–10 million from 2,451 theaters. The film made $515,000 from its early Thursday screenings and $5 million on its first day, including Thursday's gross. The film grossed $12.7 million during its opening weekend, finishing fourth at the box office, behind Star Wars: The Force Awakens ($41.6 million), The Revenant ($38 million), and Daddy's Home ($15 million).

Critical response
On review aggregator website Rotten Tomatoes, the film has a rating of 10% based on 136 reviews with an average rating of 4.10/10. The site's critical consensus reads, "The Forest offers Natalie Dormer more than a few chances to showcase her range in a dual role, but they aren't enough to offset the fact that the movie's simply not all that scary." On Metacritic, the film has a score of 34 out of 100, based on 30 critics, indicating "generally unfavourable reviews". Audiences polled by CinemaScore gave the film an average grade of "C" on an A+ to F scale.

Brian Truitt of USA Today thought the movie was a "mostly scare-free zone," and gave it two out of four possible stars. He teased the premise of the movie, saying, "It's OK to go into these woods because there's not much to get spooked by in The Forest, unless you're creeped out by the occasional Japanese schoolgirl." Comparing the film to some of its peers, he wrote the movie is "definitely a step up from screaming teenagers and some guy running through trees with a chainsaw," but expressed disappointment that the "film never makes the most of its conceit."

Peter Keough of The Boston Globe zeroed in on the writing as a source of fault, while approving of the acting and directing, writing, "Zada gets credible performances from Dormer and Kinney, but their characters undergo such unlikely psychological contortions that these efforts are to no avail." He echoed the complaints of most critics, saying, "Had Zada strayed more from the generic path into such unknown territory, The Forest might have had genuine depth and darkness."

Alonso Duralde, writing for TheWrap, voiced these gripes, as well, faulting the writing in saying, "By the time screenwriters Ben Ketai, Sarah Cornwell, and Nick Antosca unpack the inevitable third-act reversals and twists, it's too little, too late, especially since those revelations rely upon an investment in the characters that the movie has expended too little effort in creating." He praised Dormer, as well ("Dormer, for her part, invests herself in the proceedings, and manages to build two characters out of a script that barely bothers to give her one"), while panning that Kinney was ("so wooden here, he could be playing the title role").

Neil Genzlinger, writing for The New York Times, also praised Dormer's performance, while finding enough within the rest of the film's aspects to give the movie a positive review: "a decently executed creeper built around a convincing performance by Natalie Dormer." Justin Chang of Variety also allotted the film a positive review, writing, "Dormer is sympathetic enough in her double scream-queen roles, and Zada shows an occasional aptitude for generating suspense through framing, music and sound design, even if the beats he hits are often tediously familiar."

Slate's David Ehrlich said that the film's release date was the most significant indicator of its lack of quality. "Every year, during the first proper weekend of January, the studios' niche labels trot out the horror movies they know have nothing to contribute to society and leave them for dead in your local multiplex," he wrote. "[A]nybody with access to a calendar already knows that The Forest is bad; at this point, that's less of a presumption than it is a tradition." Keeping with the film's setting and themes, he likened the practice of releasing such films at that time of year to the supposed ancient Japanese custom of ubasute, in which elderly people who could no longer take care of themselves were abandoned to their fate on a mountain.

Controversy
The film attracted controversy for what some believed to be trivializing the issue of suicide in Japan, as well as disrespecting the people who have died in the real-life forest. Critic Kevin Maher wrote in his review, "The Forest is a dumb and dreary horror movie that's notable only for its racial insensitivities, lack of horror, and for making Natalie Dormer from Game of Thrones play identical twins distinguished only by hair colour."

The film's plot has been compared to the 2011 comic book The Suicide Forest, also taking place in the Aokigahara, written by El Torres and illustrated by Gabriel Hernández.

See also
 List of horror films of 2016
 The Sea of Trees
 Grave Halloween
 Forest of the Living Dead

References

External links
 
 
 
 

2016 films
2010s Japanese-language films
Film controversies
Film controversies in Japan
Obscenity controversies in film
2016 horror films
American supernatural horror films
Films about suicide
Films about twin sisters
Films based on urban legends
Films produced by David S. Goyer
Films scored by Bear McCreary
Films set in Aokigahara
Films set in forests
Films shot in Serbia
Films shot in Tokyo
Lava Bear Films films
Focus Features films
Gramercy Pictures films
Stage 6 Films films
Asian-American horror films
Japan in non-Japanese culture
2010s English-language films
2010s American films